Matt Lavelle (born 1970 in Paterson, New Jersey) is a jazz trumpet, flugelhorn, alto clarinet, and bass clarinet player.

Career
Lavelle began his music career with Hildred Humphries, a swing era veteran who played with Count Basie and Billie Holiday. He has played in ensembles led by Sabir Mateen since 2002. In 2005, he began study with Ornette Coleman. Lavelle was a member of the Bern Nix quartet since 2010. He recorded with Giuseppi Logan in 2010. In 2011 he created the 12 Houses Orchestra.

Lavelle published a book titled New York City Subway Drama and Beyond, in 2011. In 2013 he published a short story titled The Jazz Musician's Tarot Deck.

Discography

As a leader

In Swing We Trust (Unseen Rain, 2022)
Epilogue for Alto Clarinet (Bandcamp-self released Dec 2021)  
Flugelhorn meditations and improvisations (Bandcamp-self released Aug 2020)
Solo Bass Clarinet in Philadelphia (Bandcamp-self released Aug 2021)
The Big Picture (Bandcamp-self released 2020)
Trumpet Rising Bass Clarinet Moon 2020 (Bandcamp-self released 2020)
The Abandoned Sound (Bandcamp-self released 2020)
Hope (Unseen Rain,2019)
Retrograde (ESP,2018)
The Matt Lavelle Quartet (Unseen Rain,2017)
Matt Lavelle and the 12 Houses - End Times (Unseen rain,2017)
Harmolodic Monk (Unseen Rain,2016)
Matt Lavelle and the 12 Houses - Solidarity (Unseen Rain,2013)
Goodbye New York, Hello World (Spiritual Power,2010)
Matt Lavelle and Morcilla, the Manifestation Drama (Spiritual Power,2008)
Cuica In The Third House (KMB Jazz,2007)
Matt Lavelle Trio-Spiritual Power Silkheart, 2006
Trumpet Rising, Bass Clarinet Moon (Spiritual Power,2003)
Handling The Moment (CIMP,2002)

With Sumari
Sumari (Unseen Rain,2014)
Sumari II (Unseen Rain,2016)
Sumari III (Unseen Rain, 2019)
Before Testo (Unseen Rain,2020)
Sumari IV (Unseen Rain, 2021)

With Eye Contact
Embracing the Tide (Utech,2005)
Making Eye Contact With God (Utech,2005)
War Rug (KMB Jazz, 2006)

With Daniel Carter
Daniel Carter and Matt Lavelle the piano album (Bandcamp-self released 2020)
Daniel Carter and Matt Lavelle live at Tower Records (Antnimara, 2006)
Daniel Carter and Matt Lavelle (Spiritual Power, 2004)

With Bern Nix
Negative Capability (Kitchen Records,2013)

With Giuseppi Logan
The Giuseppi Logan Quintet (Tompkins Square, 2010)
Giuseppi Logan live in concert in 2009 (Bandcamp- self released 11/22)

With William Hooker
Red (Gaffer Records, 2014)

With Francois Grillot
Francois Kitchen, duets with Francois Grillot (bandcamp-self released 11/22)
 
With Steve Swell
This Now! (Cadence, 2005)
Live at the Bowery Poetry Club (Ayler, 2006)
Business of Here (Cadence, 2012)

With Sabir Mateen
Prophecies Come To Pass (577 records,2006)
The Jubilee ensemble (Not Two, 2007)

With Ras Moshe
Into the Openess (Music Now, 2002)
Schematic (Jump Arts, 2002)
Live Spirits (Utech,2005)
Sparks Trio- Short Stories In Sound (Utech,2006)

With Assif Tsahar
The Labyrinth (Hopscotch,2003)
Embracing the void (Hopscotch,2003)

With William Parker
Irving Stone memorial concert (Tzadik)
Spontaneous (Splasc(H), 2002)
For Percy Heath (Victo, 2006)
Essence of Ellington (Centering, 2012)
Universal Tonality (Aum Fidelity, 2022)
Migration of silence into and out of the Tone World (Aum Fidelity, 2021)

With Charles Waters
Peace Forms One (Nurecords,2017)
Brass Mass (Nurecords,2002)

With Barry Chabala
I Like to Play (Roeba Records,2007)

With Earth People
Waking the living (Undivided vision, 2001)

With Allen Lowe
We Will Gather When We Gather, featuring Hamiet Bluiett (Constant Sorrow, 2015)

With D3
D3 + 1.1 (Unseen Rain, 2019)

With Julie Lyon
Moonflower (Unseen Rain, 2016)
Julie (Unseen Rain, 2017)

With Tom Cabrera
Hathor (Woodshedd, 2020)
Invocation with Ras Moshe (Woodshedd, 2021)

With The cooperative sound
Cooperative Sound #3 (Nendo Dango, 2017)

With Stars Like Fleas
The Ken Burns Effect (2007, Talitres Records in Europe) (May 20, 2008 Hometapes, distribution via Absolutely Kosher/Misra)

With Eric Plaks
The Orbora Tree Suite (Darkfyre, 2022)

References

Avant-garde jazz musicians
Living people
1970 births
American jazz trumpeters
American male trumpeters
21st-century trumpeters
21st-century American male musicians
American male jazz musicians